Gregg may refer to:

Places
 Gregg, California, United States, an unincorporated community
 Gregg, Missouri, United States, an unincorporated community
 Gregg County, Texas, United States
 Gregg River, Alberta, Canada
 Gregg Seamount, Atlantic Ocean
 Gregg Township (disambiguation), three townships in the United States

People with the name
 Gregg (given name)
 Gregg (surname)

Other uses 

 Gregg shorthand, a system of shorthand named after creator John Robert Gregg
 Gregg v. Georgia, a 1976 U.S. Supreme Court decision

See also
 Gregg's (New Zealand), a food and beverage company
 Greggs plc, the largest specialist retail bakery chain in the United Kingdom
 Kima Greggs